Mardesich is a surname. Notable people with the surname include:

August P. Mardesich (1920–2016), American politician
Tony P. Mardesich (1919–1949), American politician